Diez or Díez is a surname. Notable people with the surname include:

Alfredo Diez Nieto (1918–2021) Cuban composer, conductor and professor
Barbarito Díez (1909–1995), Cuban singer
Benni Diez, German filmmaker
Eduardo Díez de Medina, Bolivian politician
Emiliano Díez, Cuban actor
Ernst Friedrich Diez, German opera singer
Fabio Díez, Argentinian-Spanish beach volleyball player
Federico Díez de Medina, Bolivian politician
Friedrich Christian Diez (1794–1876), German philologist 
Fritz Diez, East German actor and theater director.
Heinrich Friedrich von Diez, German diplomat and orientalist
Javier Diez Canseco (1948–2013), Peruvian politician
Juan Martín Díez (1775–1825), Spanish guerrilla leader
Luis Díez del Corral, Spanish lawyer and political scientist
Margarita of Diez, German noblewoman
Margarita Diez-Colunje y Pombo (1838-1919), Colombian historian, translator, genealogist
Mauricio González-Gordon y Díez (1928–2013), Spanish sherry maker and conservationist
Nicolás Diez, Argentine footballer
Ricardo Gómez Diez, Argentine politician
Samuel Friedrich Diez, German painter
Sophie Diez (1820–1887), German operatic soprano
Stefan Diez, (born 1971), German designer
Steven Diez, Spanish/Canadian tennis player
Thomas Diez, German professor of International Relations
Blessed Victoria Díez Bustos de Molina (1903-1936), Spanish teacher and religious woman
Wilhelm von Diez, German painter

See also
Dietz

German-language surnames
Spanish-language surnames
Surnames from given names